Shane McNamara is an Australian television and film actor who is best known for his many appearances in the recurring role of Gino Esposito in the Australian soap opera Neighbours.

He has also played a character called 'Rat in a Hat' in the children's television show Bananas in Pyjamas (in both the original live-action series and the CGI animated series). He has made numerous television appearances in other Australian series including Satisfaction, All Saints, Blue Heelers, Snobs, Water Rats and The Girl from Tomorrow.

Filmography
A Fortunate Life (TV mini-series 1985)
Home and Away (TV series 1989)
All the Rivers Run 2 (TV movie 1990)
Prisoners of the Sun (1990)
A Country Practice (TV series 1991)
The Girl from Tomorrow (TV movie 1992)
The Girl from Tomorrow (TV mini-series 1992)
Turtle Beach (1992)
The Custodian (1993)
Bananas in Pyjamas (TV series 1992–2001, 2011–2013)
G.P. (TV series 1993–1994)
Fallen Angels (TV series 1997)
Water Rats (TV series 1999)
Child Star: The Shirley Temple Story (TV movie 2001)
Hetty (2002)
Dirty Deeds (2002)
Blue Heelers (TV series 2002)
Snobs (TV series 2003)
All Saints (TV series 2004)
Neighbours (TV series 2001–2007)
Satisfaction (TV series 2008)
City Homicide (TV series 2008)
Rescue Special Ops (TV series 2009)

External links
 

Australian male television actors
Living people
1956 births